Salmo platycephalus,  known as the flathead trout,  Ala balik or the Turkish trout, is a type of trout, a fish in the family Salmonidae. It is endemic to southeastern Turkey.  It is known only from one population, which occupies three streams, tributaries of the Zamantı River in the Seyhan River basin.  The population itself is abundant, but subject to threat by habitat loss, since the range is small. Also, predation of juveniles by introduced rainbow trout may cause population decline. The species is classified as critically endangered.

Genetic evidence suggests that the flathead trout may indeed be derived from introduced brown trout (Salmo trutta) and thus not be a distinct species of its own. Nevertheless, it is a unique form which requires protection.

References

Literature
 Behnke, R.J. 1968. A new subgenus and species of trout, Salmo (Platysalmo) platycephalus, from south-central Turkey, with comments on the classification of the subfamily Salmoninae. Mitt. Hamburg Zool. Mus. Inst. 66: 1–15.

platycehphalus
Fish described in 1969
Fish of Turkey
Endemic fauna of Turkey
Taxonomy articles created by Polbot